East Kirkby is a village and civil parish in the East Lindsey district of Lincolnshire, England.

East Kirkby 13th century Grade II* listed Anglican parish church is dedicated to St Nicholas. The church tower and nave arcades are of Decorated style, and the chancel screen, Perpendicular. In the south aisle is a 14th-century slab to Sir Robert Sylkestone (d. 1347), founder of the chantry.

A Wesleyan chapel was established in 1862. 

East Kirkby was the birthplace of Thomas Goodrich, or Goodricke, (1494–1554). Goodrich was Bishop of Ely (1533–54) and Lord High Chancellor of England from 1551.

East Kirkby has a disused 1820 Grade II listed tower mill. The village's public house is the Red Lion on Fen Lane.

The Prime Meridian passes just to the east of East Kirkby through the former RAF East Kirkby airfield, which has a meridian marker. The airfield was a Second World War Royal Air Force station, part of which now houses the Lincolnshire Aviation Heritage Centre.

References

External links

 Lincolnshire Aviation Heritage Centre
 East Kirkby Mill

Villages in Lincolnshire
Civil parishes in Lincolnshire
Windmills in Lincolnshire
Tower mills in the United Kingdom
East Lindsey District